Lunjevica is a Serbian surname, derived from the village in central Serbia with the same name (Lunjevica). It may refer to:

Nikola Lunjevica (1776–1842), Serbian Revolutionary
Panta Lunjevica (1840–1887), Serbian politician
Draga Mašin née Lunjevica (1864–1903), Queen consort of Serbia

Serbian surnames